The 2022 Indiana Senate election took place on Tuesday November 8, 2022 with elections in the U.S. state of Indiana, coinciding with other elections in the state, U.S. House, and Indiana House, as well as various other state and local elections. Voters will elect members to 25 of the 50 seats in the Indiana Senate to serve four-year terms in single-member constituencies. The primary election took place on Tuesday May 3, 2022. The Republican Party has held a majority since 2011.

Overview

Predictions

Incumbents defeated in primaries

Republicans
District 47: Kevin Boehnlein lost renomination to fellow incumbent Gary Byrne in a redistricting race.

District index

Districts

District 1
The district has been represented by Democrat Frank Mrvan since 1998, but previously held office from 1978 to 1994. Mrvan was re-elected with 63.3% of the vote in 2018. Mrvan stepped down from his seat in January of 2022. Michael Griffin was chosen to replace him.

Democratic primary

Candidates

Declared
Martin Del Rio, Iraq war veteran and candidate for U.S. Senate in 2018
Michael Griffin, incumbent state senator and former Highland clerk-treasurer

Republican primary

Candidates

Declared
 Dan Dernulc, Lake County party chairman

General election

District 4
The district has been represented by Democrat Karen Tallian since 2005. Tallian was re-elected with 60.4% of the vote in 2018. Tallian resigned in November 2021. Rodney Pol Jr. was chosen to replace Tallian.

Democratic primary

Candidates

Declared
Deb Chubb, Michigan City School Board member
Ron Meer, former mayor of Michigan City
Todd Connor, businessman
Rodney Pol Jr., incumbent state senator

Democratic primary

Republican primary

Candidates

Declared
Jeff Larson
Johannes Poulard

Republican primary

General election

District 6
The district has been represented by Republican Rick Niemeyer since 2014. Niemeyer was re-elected with 63.2% of the vote in 2018. He is running for re-election.

Republican primary

General election

District 11
The district has been represented by Republican Linda Rogers since 2018. Rogers was elected with 61.2% of the vote in 2018. She is running for re-election.

Republican primary

Democratic primary

General election

District 14
The district has been represented by Republican Dennis Kruse since 2004. Kruse was re-elected unopposed in 2018. Kruse announced he will be retiring due to his wife's health. Physician Tyler Johnson won the Republican primary with 52.8% of the vote. Zach Heimach won in the uncontested Democratic primary.

Republican primary

Candidates

Declared
 Tyler Johnson, emergency physician
 Ron Turpin, businessman
Denny Worman, candidate for state representative (85th district) in 2012, 2014 and 2016

Declined
 Dennis Kruse, incumbent state senator

Republican primary

Democratic primary

Candidates

Declared
Zach Heimach

Democratic primary

General election

District 15
The district has been represented by Republican Liz Brown since 2014. Brown was re-elected with 55.4% of the vote in 2018. She is running for re-election.

Republican primary

General election

District 17
The district has been represented by Republican Andy Zay since 2016. Zay was re-elected with 71.8% of the vote in 2018. He is running for re-election.

Republican primary

General election

District 19
The district has been represented by Republican Travis Holdman since 2008. Holdman was re-elected unopposed in 2018.
He is running for re-election.

Republican primary

General election

District 21
The district has been represented by Republican James R. Buck since 2008. Buck was re-elected with 65.4% of the vote in 2018. He is running for re-election.

Republican primary

General election

District 22
The district has been represented by Republican Ronnie Alting since 1998. Atling was re-elected with 55.3% of the vote in 2018. He is running for re-election.

Republican primary

General election

District 23
The district has been represented by Republican Phil Boots since 2006. Boots was re-elected unopposed in 2018. The incumbent senator announced he will not seek re-election.

Republican primary

Candidates

Declared
Christian Beaver
Paula K. Copenhaver
Spencer R. Deery
Bill Webster

Declined
Phil Boots, incumbent state senator

Democratic primary

Candidates

Declared
David Sanders

General election

District 25
Incumbents Mike Gaskill and Timothy Lanane were redistricted into the same district. Lanane, who assumed office in 1997, chose to retire. Gaskill ran for re-election.

Republican primary

Candidates

Declared
Mike Gaskill, incumbent state senator for 25th district
Evan McMullen

Democratic primary

Candidates

Declared
Tamie Dixon-Tatum
Aaron Higgins

Declined
 Timothy Lanane, incumbent state senator for the 26th district

General election

District 26
The district has been represented by Republican Mike Gaskill since 2018. Gaskill was re-elected with 57.8% of the vote in 2018. The senator announced his intention for a second term in a different district.

Republican primary

Candidates

Declared
Scott Alexander, president of the Delaware County Council
Kat Kritsch

Declined
 Mike Gaskill, incumbent state senator (running in 25th district)

Democratic primary

Candidates

Declared
Melanie Wright, former state representative (35th district)

General election

District 27
The district has been represented by Republican Jeff Raatz since 2014. Raatz was re-elected with 70.9% of the vote in 2018.

Republican primary

Candidates

Declared
Jeff Raatz, incumbent state senator

Democratic primary

Candidates

Declared
Ronald Itnyre, lecturer at Indiana University East

General election

District 29
The district has been represented by Democrat J. D. Ford since 2018. Ford was first elected with 56.7% of the vote in 2018.

Democratic primary

Candidates

Declared
J. D. Ford, incumbent state senator

Republican primary

Candidates

Declared
Alex Choi

General election

District 31
The district has been represented by Republican Kyle Walker since 2020.

Republican primary

Candidates

Declared
Kyle Walker, incumbent state senator

Democratic primary

Candidates

Declared
Jocelyn Vare, Fishers City councilwoman at-large

General election
Polling

Results

District 38
The district has been represented by Republican Jon Ford since 2014. Ford was re-elected with 55.9% of the vote in 2018. He is running for re-election.

Republican primary

General election

District 39
The district has been represented by Republican Eric Bassler since 2014. Bassler was re-elected unopposed in 2018. He is running for re-election.

Republican primary

General election

District 41
The district has been represented by Republican Greg Walker since 2006. Walker was re-elected with 66.6% of the vote in 2018.

Republican primary

Candidates

Declared
Greg Walker, incumbent state senator

Democratic primary

Candidates

Declared
Bryan Muñoz

General election

District 43
The district had been represented by Republican Chip Perfect since 2014. Perfect was re-elected unopposed in 2018. He is running for re-election.

Republican primary

General election

District 45
The district has been represented by Republican Chris Garten since 2018. Garten was first elected with 62.7% of the vote in 2018.

Republican primary

Candidates

Declared
Chris Garten, incumbent state senator

Democratic primary

Candidates

Declared
 Nick Marshall

General election

District 46
The district has been represented by Republican Ron Grooms since 2010. Grooms stepped down from his seat in November of 2021. Kevin Boehnlein was chosen to replace Grooms.

Republican primary

Candidates

Declared
Evan Shearin

Declined
Kevin Boehnlein, incumbent state senator (running in 47th district)

Democratic primary

Candidates

Declared
 Kristin Jones, Indianapolis City-County Council Councillor
Ashley Eason, nominee for State Senate (36th district) in 2020
Andrea Hunley, Indianapolis Public Schools principal
Bobby Kern, perennial candidate
Karla Lopez Owens, employee with the Marion County Prosecutor's Office

General election

District 47
The district has been represented by Republican Erin Houchin since 2014. Houchin was re-elected with 66.5% of the vote in 2018. Houchin stepped down in January of 2022 to focus on running for Indiana's 9th congressional district. Gary Byrne won a caucus election and was chosen to represent the district.

Republican primary

Candidates

Declared
Kevin Boehnlein, incumbent state senator for 46th district
Gary Byrne, incumbent state senator for 47th district

Disqualified/Withdrew 
Keeley R. Stingel

Declined
 Erin Houchin, incumbent senator (running for Indiana's 9th congressional district)

General election

District 48
The district has been represented by Republican Mark Messmer since 2014. Manning was re-elected unopposed in 2018. He is running for re-election.

Republican primary

General election

District 49
The district has been represented by Republican Jim Tomes since 2010. Tomes was re-elected with 64.0% of the vote in 2018. He is running for re-election.

Republican primary

General election

Notes

Partisan clients

References

Indiana Senate elections
Senate
Indiana State Senate